Benjamin Lee Whorf (April 24, 1897 – July 26, 1941) was an American linguist and fire prevention engineer. He is known for the "Sapir–Whorf hypothesis," the idea that differences between the structures of different languages shape how their speakers perceive and conceptualize the world. This principle, named after him and his mentor Edward Sapir, was initially called linguistic relativity by Whorf because he saw the idea as having implications similar to Einstein’s principle of physical relativity. The idea, however, follows from post-Hegelian 19th-century philosophy, especially from Wilhelm von Humboldt and from Wilhelm Wundt's Völkerpsychologie.

Throughout his life, Whorf was a chemical engineer by profession but as a young man, he took an interest in linguistics. At first, this interest drew him to the study of Biblical Hebrew, but he quickly went on to study the indigenous languages of Mesoamerica on his own. Professional scholars were impressed by his work and in 1930, he received a grant to study the Nahuatl language in Mexico; on his return home, he presented several influential papers on the language at linguistics conferences.

This led him to begin studying linguistics with Edward Sapir at Yale University while still maintaining his day job at the Hartford Fire Insurance Company. During his time at Yale, he worked on the description of the Hopi language (including his now-infamous claims about its lack of conception of time), and the historical linguistics of the Uto-Aztecan languages, publishing many influential papers in professional journals. He was chosen as the substitute for Sapir during his medical leave in 1938. Whorf taught his seminar on "Problems of American Indian Linguistics". In addition to his well-known work on linguistic relativity, he wrote a grammar sketch of Hopi and studies of Nahuatl dialects, proposed a deciphering of Maya hieroglyphic writing, and published the first attempt towards a reconstruction of Uto-Aztecan.

After his death from cancer in 1941, his manuscripts were curated by his linguist friends who also worked to spread the influence of Whorf's ideas on the relation between language, culture and cognition. Many of his works were published posthumously in the first decades after his death. In the 1960s, Whorf's views fell out of favor and he became the subject of harsh criticisms by scholars who considered language structure to primarily reflect cognitive universals rather than cultural differences. Critics argued that Whorf's ideas were untestable and poorly formulated and that they were based on badly analyzed or misunderstood data.

In the late 20th century, interest in Whorf's ideas experienced a resurgence, and a new generation of scholars began reading Whorf's works, arguing that previous critiques had only engaged superficially with Whorf's actual ideas, or had attributed to him ideas he had never expressed. The field of linguistic relativity studies remains an active focus of research in psycholinguistics and linguistic anthropology, and continues to generate debate and controversy between proponents of relativism and proponents of universalism. By comparison, Whorf's other work in linguistics, the development of such concepts as the allophone and the cryptotype, and the formulation of "Whorf's law" in Uto-Aztecan historical linguistics, have met with broad acceptance.

Biography

Early life 
The son of Harry Church Whorf and Sarah Edna Lee Whorf, Benjamin Lee Whorf was born on April 24, 1897 in Winthrop, Massachusetts. Harry Church Whorf was an artist, intellectual, and designer – first working as a commercial artist and later as a dramatist. Whorf had two younger brothers, John and Richard, who both went on to become notable artists. John became an internationally renowned painter and illustrator; Richard was an actor in films such as Yankee Doodle Dandy and later an Emmy-nominated television director of such shows as The Beverly Hillbillies. Whorf was the intellectual of the three and started conducting chemical experiments with his father's photographic equipment at a young age. He was also an avid reader, interested in botany, astrology, and Middle American prehistory. He read William H. Prescott's Conquest of Mexico several times. At the age of 17, he began keeping a copious diary in which he recorded his thoughts and dreams.

Career in fire prevention 
Whorf graduated from the Massachusetts Institute of Technology in 1918 with a degree in chemical engineering where his academic performance was of average quality. In 1920, he married Celia Inez Peckham, who became the mother of his three children, Raymond Ben, Robert Peckham and Celia Lee. Around the same time he began work as a fire prevention engineer (an inspector) for the Hartford Fire Insurance Company. He was particularly good at the job and was highly commended by his employers. His job required him to travel to production facilities throughout New England to be inspected. One anecdote describes him arriving at a chemical plant in which he was denied access by the director because he would not allow anyone to see the production procedure which was a trade secret. Having been told what the plant produced, Whorf wrote a chemical formula on a piece of paper, saying to the director: "I think this is what you're doing". The surprised director asked Whorf how he knew about the secret procedure, and he simply answered: "You couldn't do it in any other way."

Whorf helped to attract new customers to the Fire Insurance Company; they favored his thorough inspections and recommendations. Another famous anecdote from his job was used by Whorf to argue that language use affects habitual behavior. Whorf described a workplace in which full gasoline drums were stored in one room and empty ones in another; he said that because of flammable vapor the "empty" drums were more dangerous than those that were full, although workers handled them less carefully to the point that they smoked in the room with "empty" drums, but not in the room with full ones. Whorf argued that by habitually speaking of the vapor-filled drums as empty and by extension as inert, the workers were oblivious to the risk posed by smoking near the "empty drums".

Early interest in religion and language 
Whorf was a spiritual man throughout his lifetime although what religion he followed has been the subject of debate. As a young man, he produced a manuscript titled "Why I have discarded evolution", causing some scholars to describe him as a devout Methodist, who was impressed with fundamentalism, and perhaps supportive of creationism. However, throughout his life Whorf's main religious interest was theosophy, a nonsectarian organization based on Buddhist and Hindu teachings that promotes the view of the world as an interconnected whole and the unity and brotherhood of humankind "without distinction of race, creed, sex, caste or color". Some scholars have argued that the conflict between spiritual and scientific inclinations has been a driving force in Whorf's intellectual development, particularly in the attraction by ideas of linguistic relativity. Whorf said that "of all groups of people with whom I have come in contact, Theosophical people seem the most capable of becoming excited about ideas—new ideas."

Around 1924, Whorf first became interested in linguistics. Originally, he analyzed Biblical texts, seeking to uncover hidden layers of meaning. Inspired by the esoteric work La langue hebraïque restituée by Antoine Fabre d'Olivet, he began a semantic and grammatical analysis of Biblical Hebrew. Whorf's early manuscripts on Hebrew and Maya have been described as exhibiting a considerable degree of mysticism, as he sought to uncover esoteric meanings of glyphs and letters.

Early studies in Mesoamerican linguistics 
Whorf studied Biblical linguistics mainly at the Watkinson Library (now Hartford Public Library). This library had an extensive collection of materials about Native American linguistics and folklore, originally collected by James Hammond Trumbull. It was at the Watkinson library that Whorf became friends with the young boy, John B. Carroll, who later went on to study psychology under B. F. Skinner, and who in 1956 edited and published a selection of Whorf's essays as Language, Thought and Reality . The collection rekindled Whorf's interest in Mesoamerican antiquity. He began studying the Nahuatl language in 1925, and later, beginning in 1928, he studied the collections of Maya hieroglyphic texts. Quickly becoming conversant with the materials, he began a scholarly dialog with Mesoamericanists such as Alfred Tozzer, the Maya archaeologist at Harvard University, and Herbert Spinden of the Brooklyn Museum.

In 1928, he first presented a paper at the International Congress of Americanists in which he presented his translation of a Nahuatl document held at the Peabody Museum at Harvard. He also began to study the comparative linguistics of the Uto-Aztecan language family, which Edward Sapir had recently demonstrated to be a linguistic family. In addition to Nahuatl, Whorf studied the Piman and Tepecano languages, while in close correspondence with linguist J. Alden Mason.

Field studies in Mexico 
Because of the promise shown by his work on Uto-Aztecan, Tozzer and Spinden advised Whorf to apply for a grant with the Social Science Research Council (SSRC) to support his research. Whorf considered using the money to travel to Mexico to procure Aztec manuscripts for the Watkinson library, but Tozzer suggested he spend the time in Mexico documenting modern Nahuatl dialects. In his application Whorf proposed to establish the oligosynthetic nature of the Nahuatl language. Before leaving Whorf presented the paper "Stem series in Maya" at the Linguistic Society of America conference, in which he argued that in the Mayan languages syllables carry symbolic content. The SSRC awarded Whorf the grant and in 1930 he traveled to Mexico City, where Professor Robert H. Barlow put him in contact with several speakers of Nahuatl to serve as his informants. The outcome of the trip to Mexico was Whorf's sketch of Milpa Alta Nahuatl, published only after his death, and an article on a series of Aztec pictograms found at the Tepozteco monument at Tepoztlán, Morelos in which he noted similarities in form and meaning between Aztec and Maya day signs.

At Yale 

Although Whorf had been entirely an autodidact in linguistic theory and field methodology up to this point, he had already made a name for himself in Mesoamerican linguistics. Whorf had met Sapir, the leading US linguist of the day, at professional conferences, and in 1931 Sapir came to Yale from the University of Chicago to take a position as Professor of Anthropology. Alfred Tozzer sent Sapir a copy of Whorf's paper on "Nahuatl tones and saltillo". Sapir replied stating that it "should by all means be published"; however, it was not until 1993 that it was prepared for publication by Lyle Campbell and Frances Karttunen.

Whorf took Sapir's first course at Yale on "American Indian Linguistics". He enrolled in a program of graduate studies, nominally working towards a PhD in linguistics, but he never actually attempted to obtain a degree, satisfying himself with participating in the intellectual community around Sapir. At Yale, Whorf joined the circle of Sapir's students that included such luminaries as Morris Swadesh, Mary Haas, Harry Hoijer, G. L. Trager and Charles F. Voegelin. Whorf took on a central role among Sapir's students and was well respected.

Sapir had a profound influence on Whorf's thinking. Sapir's earliest writings had espoused views of the relation between thought and language stemming from the Humboldtian tradition he acquired through Franz Boas, which regarded language as the historical embodiment of volksgeist, or ethnic world view. But Sapir had since become influenced by a current of logical positivism, such as that of Bertrand Russell and the early Ludwig Wittgenstein, particularly through Ogden and Richards' The Meaning of Meaning, from which he adopted the view that natural language potentially obscures, rather than facilitates, the mind to perceive and describe the world as it really is. In this view, proper perception could only be accomplished through formal logics. During his stay at Yale, Whorf acquired this current of thought partly from Sapir and partly through his own readings of Russell and Ogden and Richards. As Whorf became more influenced by positivist science he also distanced himself from some approaches to language and meaning that he saw as lacking in rigor and insight. One of these was Polish philosopher Alfred Korzybski's General semantics, which was espoused in the US by Stuart Chase. Chase admired Whorf's work and frequently sought out a reluctant Whorf, who considered Chase to be "utterly incompetent by training and background to handle such a subject." Ironically, Chase would later write the foreword for Carroll's collection of Whorf's writings.

Work on Hopi and descriptive linguistics 
Sapir also encouraged Whorf to continue his work on the historical and descriptive linguistics of Uto-Aztecan. Whorf published several articles on that topic in this period, some of them with G. L. Trager, who had become his close friend. Whorf took a special interest in the Hopi language and started working with Ernest Naquayouma, a speaker of Hopi from Toreva village living in Manhattan, New York. Whorf credited Naquayouma as the source of most of his information on the Hopi language, although in 1938 he took a short field trip to the village of Mishongnovi, on the Second Mesa of the Hopi Reservation in Arizona.

In 1936, Whorf was appointed Honorary Research Fellow in Anthropology at Yale, and he was invited by Franz Boas to serve on the committee of the Society of American Linguistics (later Linguistic Society of America). In 1937, Yale awarded him the Sterling Fellowship. He was a lecturer in Anthropology from 1937 through 1938, replacing Sapir, who was gravely ill. Whorf gave graduate level lectures on "Problems of American Indian Linguistics". In 1938 with Trager's assistance he elaborated a report on the progress of linguistic research at the department of anthropology at Yale. The report includes some of Whorf's influential contributions to linguistic theory, such as the concept of the allophone and of covert grammatical categories.  has argued, that in this report Whorf's linguistic theories exist in a condensed form, and that it was mainly through this report that Whorf exerted influence on the discipline of descriptive linguistics.

Final years 
In late 1938, Whorf's own health declined. After an operation for cancer, he fell into an unproductive period. He was also deeply affected by Sapir's death in early 1939. It was in the writings of his last two years that he laid out the research program of linguistic relativity. His 1939 memorial article for Sapir, "The Relation of Habitual Thought And Behavior to Language", in particular has been taken to be Whorf's definitive statement of the issue, and is his most frequently quoted piece.

In his last year Whorf also published three articles in the MIT Technology Review titled "Science and Linguistics", "Linguistics as an Exact Science" and "Language and Logic". He was also invited to contribute an article to a theosophical journal, Theosophist, published in Madras, India, for which he wrote "Language, Mind and Reality". In these final pieces, he offered a critique of Western science in which he suggested that non-European languages often referred to physical phenomena in ways that more directly reflected aspects of reality than many European languages, and that science ought to pay attention to the effects of linguistic categorization in its efforts to describe the physical world. He particularly criticized the Indo-European languages for promoting a mistaken essentialist world view, which had been disproved by advances in the sciences, whereas he suggested that other languages dedicated more attention to processes and dynamics rather than stable essences. Whorf argued that paying attention to how other physical phenomena are described in the study of linguistics could make valuable contributions to science by pointing out the ways in which certain assumptions about reality are implicit in the structure of language itself, and how language guides the attention of speakers towards certain phenomena in the world which risk becoming overemphasized while leaving other phenomena at risk of being overlooked.

Posthumous reception and legacy 
At Whorf's death, his friend G. L. Trager was appointed as curator of his unpublished manuscripts. Some of them were published in the years after his death by another of Whorf's friends, Harry Hoijer. In the decade following, Trager and particularly Hoijer did much to popularize Whorf's ideas about linguistic relativity, and it was Hoijer who coined the term "Sapir–Whorf hypothesis" at a 1954 conference. Trager then published an article titled "The systematization of the Whorf hypothesis", which contributed to the idea that Whorf had proposed a hypothesis that should be the basis for a program of empirical research. Hoijer also published studies of Indigenous languages and cultures of the American South West in which Whorf found correspondences between cultural patterns and linguistic ones. The term, even though technically a misnomer, went on to become the most widely known label for Whorf's ideas. According to John A. Lucy, "Whorf's work in linguistics was and still is recognized as being of superb professional quality by linguists".

Universalism and anti-Whorfianism 
Whorf's work began to fall out of favor less than a decade after his death, and he was subjected to severe criticism from scholars of language, culture and psychology. In 1953 and 1954, psychologists Roger Brown and Eric Lenneberg criticized Whorf for his reliance on anecdotal evidence, formulating a hypothesis to scientifically test his ideas, which they limited to an examination of a causal relation between grammatical or lexical structure and cognition or perception. Whorf himself did not advocate a straight causality between language and thought; instead he wrote that "Language and culture had grown up together"; that both were mutually shaped by the other. Hence,  has argued that because the aim of the formulation of the Sapir–Whorf hypothesis was to test simple causation, it failed to test Whorf's ideas from the outset.

Focusing on color terminology, with easily discernible differences between perception and vocabulary, Brown and Lenneberg published in 1954 a study of Zuni color terms that slightly support a weak effect of semantic categorization of color terms on color perception. In doing so they began a line of empirical studies that investigated the principle of linguistic relativity.

Empirical testing of the Whorfian hypothesis declined in the 1960s to 1980s as Noam Chomsky began to redefine linguistics and much of psychology in formal universalist terms. Several studies from that period refuted Whorf's hypothesis, demonstrating that linguistic diversity is a surface veneer that masks underlying universal cognitive principles. Many studies were highly critical and disparaging in their language, ridiculing Whorf's analyses and examples or his lack of an academic degree. Throughout the 1980s, most mentions of Whorf or of the Sapir–Whorf hypotheses continued to be disparaging, and led to a widespread view that Whorf's ideas had been proven wrong. Because Whorf was treated so severely in the scholarship during those decades, he has been described as "one of the prime whipping boys of introductory texts to linguistics". With the advent of cognitive linguistics and psycholinguistics in the late 1980s, some linguists sought to rehabilitate Whorf's reputation, as scholarship began to question whether earlier critiques of Whorf were justified.

By the 1960s, analytical philosophers also became aware of the Sapir–Whorf hypothesis, and philosophers such as Max Black and Donald Davidson published scathing critiques of Whorf's strong relativist viewpoints. Black characterized Whorf's ideas about metaphysics as demonstrating "amateurish crudity". According to Black and Davidson, Whorf's viewpoint and the concept of linguistic relativity meant that translation between languages with different conceptual schemes would be impossible. Recent assessments such as those by Leavitt and Lee, however, consider Black and Davidson's interpretation to be based on an inaccurate characterization of Whorf's viewpoint, and even rather absurd given the time he spent trying to translate between different conceptual schemes. In their view, the critiques are based on a lack of familiarity with Whorf's writings; according to these recent Whorf scholars a more accurate description of his viewpoint is that he thought translation to be possible, but only through careful attention to the subtle differences between conceptual schemes.

Eric Lenneberg, Noam Chomsky, and Steven Pinker have also criticized Whorf for failing to be sufficiently clear in his formulation of how language influences thought, and for failing to provide real evidence to support his assumptions. Generally Whorf's arguments took the form of examples that were anecdotal or speculative, and functioned as attempts to show how "exotic" grammatical traits were connected to what were considered equally exotic worlds of thought. Even Whorf's defenders admitted that his writing style was often convoluted and couched in neologisms – attributed to his awareness of language use, and his reluctance to use terminology that might have pre-existing connotations.  argues that Whorf was mesmerized by the foreignness of indigenous languages, and exaggerated and idealized them. According to Lakoff, Whorf's tendency to exoticize data must be judged in the historical context: Whorf and the other Boasians wrote at a time in which racism and jingoism were predominant, and when it was unthinkable to many that "savages" had redeeming qualities, or that their languages were comparable in complexity to those of Europe. For this alone Lakoff argues, Whorf can be considered to be "Not just a pioneer in linguistics, but a pioneer as a human being".

Today many followers of universalist schools of thought continue to oppose the idea of linguistic relativity, seeing it as unsound or even ridiculous. For example, Steven Pinker argues in his book The Language Instinct that thought exists prior to language and independently of it, a view also espoused by philosophers of language such as Jerry Fodor, John Locke and Plato. In this interpretation, language is inconsequential to human thought because humans do not think in "natural" language, i.e. any language used for communication. Rather, we think in a meta-language that precedes natural language, which Pinker following Fodor calls "mentalese." Pinker attacks what he calls "Whorf's radical position", declaring, "the more you examine Whorf's arguments, the less sense they make." Scholars of a more "relativist" bent such as John A. Lucy and Stephen C. Levinson have criticized Pinker for misrepresenting Whorf's views and arguing against strawmen.

Resurgence of Whorfianism 
Linguistic relativity studies have experienced a resurgence since the 1990s, and a series of favorable experimental results have brought Whorfianism back into favor, especially in cultural psychology and linguistic anthropology. The first study directing positive attention towards Whorf's relativist position was George Lakoff's "Women, Fire and Dangerous Things", in which he argued that Whorf had been on the right track in his focus on differences in grammatical and lexical categories as a source of differences in conceptualization. In 1992 psychologist John A. Lucy published two books on the topic, one analyzing the intellectual genealogy of the hypothesis, arguing that previous studies had failed to appreciate the subtleties of Whorf's thinking; they had been unable to formulate a research agenda that would actually test Whorf's claims. Lucy proposed a new research design so that the hypothesis of linguistic relativity could be tested empirically, and to avoid the pitfalls of earlier studies which Lucy claimed had tended to presuppose the universality of the categories they were studying. His second book was an empirical study of the relation between grammatical categories and cognition in the Yucatec Maya language of Mexico.

In 1996 Penny Lee's reappraisal of Whorf's writings was published, reinstating Whorf as a serious and capable thinker. Lee argued that previous explorations of the Sapir–Whorf hypothesis had largely ignored Whorf's actual writings, and consequently asked questions very unlike those Whorf had asked. Also in that year a volume, "Rethinking Linguistic Relativity" edited by John J. Gumperz and Stephen C. Levinson gathered a range of researchers working in psycholinguistics, sociolinguistics and linguistic anthropology to bring renewed attention to the issue of how Whorf's theories could be updated, and a subsequent review of the new direction of the linguistic relativity paradigm cemented the development. Since then considerable empirical research into linguistic relativity has been carried out, especially at the Max Planck Institute for Psycholinguistics with scholarship motivating two edited volumes of linguistic relativity studies, and in American Institutions by scholars such as Lera Boroditsky and Dedre Gentner.

In turn universalist scholars frequently dismiss as "dull" or "boring", positive findings of influence of linguistic categories on thought or behavior, which are often subtle rather than spectacular, suggesting that Whorf's excitement about linguistic relativity had promised more spectacular findings than it was able to provide.

Whorf's views have been compared to those of philosophers such as Friedrich Nietzsche and the late Ludwig Wittgenstein, both of whom considered language to have important bearing on thought and reasoning. His hypotheses have also been compared to the views of psychologists such as Lev Vygotsky, whose social constructivism considers the cognitive development of children to be mediated by the social use of language. Vygotsky shared Whorf's interest in gestalt psychology, and he also read Sapir's works. Others have seen similarities between Whorf's work and the ideas of literary theorist Mikhail Bakhtin, who read Whorf and whose approach to textual meaning was similarly holistic and relativistic. Whorf's ideas have also been interpreted as a radical critique of positivist science.

Work

Linguistic relativity 

Whorf is best known as the main proponent of what he called the principle of linguistic relativity, but which is often known as "the Sapir–Whorf hypothesis", named for him and Edward Sapir. Whorf never stated the principle in the form of a hypothesis, and the idea that linguistic categories influence perception and cognition was shared by many other scholars before him. But because Whorf, in his articles, gave specific examples of how he saw the grammatical categories of specific languages related to conceptual and behavioral patterns, he pointed towards an empirical research program that has been taken up by subsequent scholars, and which is often called "Sapir–Whorf studies".

Sources of influence on Whorf's thinking 

Whorf and Sapir both drew explicitly on Albert Einstein's principle of general relativity; hence linguistic relativity refers to the concept of grammatical and semantic categories of a specific language providing a frame of reference as a medium through which observations are made. Following an original observation by Boas, Sapir demonstrated that speakers of a given language perceive sounds that are acoustically different as the same, if the sound comes from the underlying phoneme and does not contribute to changes in semantic meaning. Furthermore, speakers of languages are attentive to sounds, particularly if the same two sounds come from different phonemes. Such differentiation is an example of how various observational frames of reference leads to different patterns of attention and perception.

Whorf was also influenced by gestalt psychology, believing that languages require their speakers to describe the same events as different gestalt constructions, which he called "isolates from experience". An example is how the action of cleaning a gun is different in English and Shawnee: English focuses on the instrumental relation between two objects and the purpose of the action (removing dirt); whereas the Shawnee language focuses on the movement—using an arm to create a dry space in a hole. The event described is the same, but the attention in terms of figure and ground are different.

Degree of influence of language on thought 
If read superficially, some of Whorf's statements lend themselves to the interpretation that he supported linguistic determinism. For example, in an often-quoted passage Whorf writes:

The statements about the obligatory nature of the terms of language have been taken to suggest that Whorf meant that language completely determined the scope of possible conceptualizations. However neo-Whorfians argue that here Whorf is writing about the terms in which we speak of the world, not the terms in which we think of it. Whorf noted that to communicate thoughts and experiences with members of a speech community speakers must use the linguistic categories of their shared language, which requires moulding experiences into the shape of language to speak them—a process called "thinking for speaking". This interpretation is supported by Whorf's subsequent statement that "No individual is free to describe nature with absolute impartiality, but is constrained by certain modes of interpretation even when he thinks himself most free". Similarly the statement that observers are led to different pictures of the universe has been understood as an argument that different conceptualizations are incommensurable making translation between different conceptual and linguistic systems impossible. Neo-Whorfians argue this to be a misreading since throughout his work one of his main points was that such systems could be "calibrated" and thereby be made commensurable, but only when we become aware of the differences in conceptual schemes through linguistic analysis.

Hopi time 

Whorf's study of Hopi time has been the most widely discussed and criticized example of linguistic relativity. In his analysis he argues that there is a relation between how the Hopi people conceptualize time, how they speak of temporal relations, and the grammar of the Hopi language. Whorf's most elaborate argument for the existence of linguistic relativity was based on what he saw as a fundamental difference in the understanding of time as a conceptual category among the Hopi. He argued that the Hopi language, in contrast to English and other SAE languages, does not treat the flow of time as a sequence of distinct countable instances, like "three days" or "five years", but rather as a single process. Because of this difference, the language lacks nouns that refer to units of time. He proposed that the Hopi view of time was fundamental in all aspects of their culture and furthermore explained certain patterns of behavior. In his 1939 memorial essay to Sapir he wrote that "... the Hopi language is seen to contain no words, grammatical forms, construction or expressions that refer directly to what we call 'time', or to past, present, or future..."

Linguist Ekkehart Malotki challenged Whorf's analyses of Hopi temporal expressions and concepts with numerous examples how the Hopi language refers to time. Malotki argues that in the Hopi language the system of tenses consists of future and non-future and that the single difference between the three-tense system of European languages and the Hopi system, is that the latter combines past and present to form a single category.

Malotki's critique was widely cited as the final piece of evidence in refuting Whorf's ideas and his concept of linguistic relativity while other scholars defended the analysis of Hopi, arguing that Whorf's claim was not that Hopi lacked words or categories to describe temporality, but that the Hopi concept of time is altogether different from that of English speakers. Whorf described the Hopi categories of tense, noting that time is not divided into past, present and future, as is common in European languages, but rather a single tense refers to both present and past while another refers to events that have not yet happened and may or may not happen in the future. He also described a large array of stems that he called "tensors" which describes aspects of temporality, but without referring to countable units of time as in English and most European languages.

Contributions to linguistic theory 
Whorf's distinction between "overt" (phenotypical) and "covert" (cryptotypical) grammatical categories has become widely influential in linguistics and anthropology. British linguist Michael Halliday wrote about Whorf's notion of the "cryptotype", and the conception of "how grammar models reality", that it would "eventually turn out to be among the major contributions of twentieth century linguistics".

Furthermore, Whorf introduced the concept of the allophone, a word that describes positional phonetic variants of a single superordinate phoneme; in doing so he placed a cornerstone in consolidating early phoneme theory. The term was popularized by G. L. Trager and Bernard Bloch in a 1941 paper on English phonology and went on to become part of standard usage within the American structuralist tradition. Whorf considered allophones to be another example of linguistic relativity. The principle of allophony describes how acoustically different sounds can be treated as reflections of a single phoneme in a language. This sometimes makes the different sound appear similar to native speakers of the language, even to the point that they are unable to distinguish them auditorily without special training. Whorf wrote that: "[allophones] are also relativistic. Objectively, acoustically, and physiologically the allophones of [a] phoneme may be extremely unlike, hence the impossibility of determining what is what. You always have to keep the observer in the picture. What linguistic pattern makes like is like, and what it makes unlike is unlike".(Whorf, 1940)

Central to Whorf's inquiries was the approach later described as metalinguistics by G. L. Trager, who in 1950 published four of Whorf's essays as "Four articles on Metalinguistics". Whorf was crucially interested in the ways in which speakers come to be aware of the language that they use, and become able to describe and analyze language using language itself to do so. Whorf saw that the ability to arrive at progressively more accurate descriptions of the world hinged partly on the ability to construct a metalanguage to describe how language affects experience, and thus to have the ability to calibrate different conceptual schemes. Whorf's endeavors have since been taken up in the development of the study of metalinguistics and metalinguistic awareness, first by Michael Silverstein who published a radical and influential rereading of Whorf in 1979 and subsequently in the field of linguistic anthropology.

Studies of Uto-Aztecan languages 
Whorf conducted important work on the Uto-Aztecan languages, which Sapir had conclusively demonstrated as a valid language family in 1915. Working first on Nahuatl, Tepecano, Tohono O'odham he established familiarity with the language group before he met Sapir in 1928. During Whorf's time at Yale he published several articles on Uto-Aztecan linguistics, such as "Notes on the Tübatulabal language". In 1935 he published "The Comparative Linguistics of Uto-Aztecan", and a review of Kroeber's survey of Uto-Aztecan linguistics. Whorf's work served to further cement the foundations of the comparative Uto-Aztecan studies.

The first Native American language Whorf studied was the Uto-Aztecan language Nahuatl which he studied first from colonial grammars and documents, and later became the subject of his first field work experience in 1930. Based on his studies of Classical Nahuatl Whorf argued that Nahuatl was an oligosynthetic language, a typological category that he invented. In Mexico working with native speakers, he studied the dialects of Milpa Alta and Tepoztlán. His grammar sketch of the Milpa Alta dialect of Nahuatl was not published during his lifetime, but it was published posthumously by Harry Hoijer and became quite influential and used as the basic description of "Modern Nahuatl" by many scholars. The description of the dialect is quite condensed and in some places difficult to understand because of Whorf's propensity of inventing his own unique terminology for grammatical concepts, but the work has generally been considered to be technically advanced. He also produced an analysis of the prosody of these dialects which he related to the history of the glottal stop and vowel length in Nahuan languages. This work was prepared for publication by Lyle Campbell and Frances Karttunen in 1993, who also considered it a valuable description of the two endangered dialects, and the only one of its kind to include detailed phonetic analysis of supra-segmental phenomena.

In Uto-Aztecan linguistics one of Whorf's achievements was to determine the reason the Nahuatl language has the phoneme , not found in the other languages of the family. This sound law is known as "Whorf's law", considered valid although a more detailed understanding of the precise conditions under which it took place has since been developed.

Also in 1937, Whorf and his friend G. L. Trager, published a paper in which they elaborated on the Azteco-Tanoan language family, proposed originally by Sapir as a family comprising the Uto-Aztecan and the Kiowa-Tanoan languages—(the Tewa and Kiowa languages).

Maya epigraphy 
In a series of published and unpublished studies in the 1930s, Whorf argued that Mayan writing was to some extent phonetic. While his work on deciphering the Maya script gained some support from Alfred Tozzer at Harvard, the main authority on Ancient Maya culture, J. E. S. Thompson, strongly rejected Whorf's ideas, saying that Mayan writing lacked a phonetic component and is therefore impossible to decipher based on a linguistic analysis. Whorf argued that it was exactly the reluctance to apply linguistic analysis of Maya languages that had held the decipherment back. Whorf sought for cues to phonetic values within the elements of the specific signs, and never realized that the system was logo-syllabic. Although Whorf's approach to understanding the Maya script is now known to have been misguided, his central claim that the script was phonetic and should be deciphered as such was vindicated by Yuri Knorozov's syllabic decipherment of Mayan writing in the 1950s.

Notes

Commentary notes

References

Sources

External links 

 B. L. Whorf, .
 Benjamin Lee Whorf Papers (MS 822). Manuscripts and Archives, Yale University Library.
 What Whorf Really Said – Evaluation of Pinker's (1994) critique of Whorf, by Nick Yee

1897 births
1941 deaths
People from Winthrop, Massachusetts
Linguists from the United States
American Mesoamericanists
MIT School of Engineering alumni
Linguists of Mesoamerican languages
Mesoamerican epigraphers
Mayanists
American translation scholars
20th-century Mesoamericanists
Yale University alumni
Linguists of Aztec–Tanoan languages
Linguists of Uto-Aztecan languages
Linguists of Tanoan languages
Paleolinguists
20th-century linguists
Linguists of indigenous languages of North America
American chemical engineers
20th-century American anthropologists